Akiga Sai (1898–1959) was an early Nigerian autobiographer and historian, known for his History of the Tiv.

Sai's Tiv language manuscript was edited and translated into English by Rupert East, and first published in 1939. In 2015 a full edition was published and several other articles published about Sai (by Fardon, Pine and Bergsma among others).

Fardon (2015: 572), citing the Tiv historian Atah Pine accords Akiga Sai the following Tiv "firsts": "the first Tiv man to be baptized as a Christian, the first Tiv man to read and write, the first Tiv man to write a letter, first Tiv parliamentarian, first Tiv newspaper editor, and first Tiv man to write a book."

In Sklar's book on Nigerian political parties, Sai is listed on as a Benue state member of the National People's Congress for 1958.

References

Further reading 
 'Journal of the International African Institute /Revue de l’Institut Africain International Special Issue, Vol. 85 No. 4 November 2015 "Local Intellectuals: Akiga's History of the Tiv"

20th-century Nigerian historians
1898 births
1959 deaths
Tiv people
Nigerian autobiographers